This is a list of Malayalam films that are scheduled to release in 2021.

January – March

April – June

July - September

October - December

References

External links 
 Malayalam Upcoming Releases

2021
Lists of 2021 films by country or language
 2021
2021 in Indian cinema